The  is the largest learned society for philosophy in Japan. The purpose of the association is to "promote the study of philosophy and active interaction among researchers from philosophy, working as a forum to discuss on research, education and the role of philosophy in the modern world." The association was founded by Japanese philosophers in 1949, with Amano Teiyū (September 30, 1884 – March 6, 1980) being elected its first president. Since 1952, the association has published the journal  annually, with Volume 69 releasing in April 2018.

History 
The PAJ was founded in 1949 by Japanese philosophers, with Amano Teiyū being elected its first president. Beginning in 1952, mainly through the efforts of presidents Amano, Ide Takashi (March 10, 1892 – March 9, 1980), Shimomura Toratarō (August 17, 1902 – January 22, 1995), Mutai Risaku (August 8, 1880 – July 5, 1974), and Watsuji Tetsurō (1889 – 1960), the first edition of the association's journal  was published "with the primary purpose of offering occasions for the exchange of opinions and information about research in philosophy inside and outside of Japan".

Activities 

Annual conference
The PAJ organizes a three-day conference during which it hosts oral presentations, a general symposium, a "societies symposium", international sessions, joint research workshops, PAJ working group workshops, and the general assembly. It most recently held the 77th conference on May 18–20, 2018 at Kobe University.
Publications:

Tetsugaku (Philosophy): Annual Review of the Philosophical Association of Japan
 Tetsugaku: International Journal of the Philosophical Association of Japan
 The Gate of Philosophy: Journal for Graduate Students

Working groups
The PAJ organizes three "working groups" concerning gender equality and support for young philosophers, education on philosophy, and the international exchange of research.
Awards and Grants
The PAJ has established the annual PAJ Young Researcher Award and the Hayashi Foundation Grants for Young Researchers with the aim of encouraging young researchers and developing philosophical research within Japan.

Presidents 
Names and terms served of all past PAJ presidents:

References

External links 

 Official Website
The Association's summary page
English webpage
J-STAGE

Organizations established in 1949
Philosophical societies
Philosophy organizations
Professional associations based in Japan